Army 2020 Refine was the name given to the restructuring of the British Army, in light of the Strategic Defence and Security Review 2015.

Army 2020 Refine

The Strategic Defence and Security Review 2015 announced that the structure of the Reaction and Adaptable Forces would further change, in an evolution of the previous Army 2020 plan. The main changes of Army 2020 Refine were:
Creation of two new "Strike brigades", to be formed by converting an Armoured Infantry brigade and an Infantry brigade. These will be formed by 2025, comprising 5,000 personnel each, equipped with Ajax vehicles.
The UK's 3rd division will, by 2025, comprise two armoured infantry brigades, a strike brigade, and a strike experimentation group (which would later convert to a second Strike brigade).
Creation of a Specialised Infantry Group, to be formed by converting four infantry battalions and creation of a new battalion and training cell.
Two innovative brigades were to be established, comprising a mix of regulars and specialist capabilities from the reserves, that were able to contribute to strategic communications, tackle hybrid warfare and deliver better battlefield intelligence.

Strike brigades & Armoured Infantry brigades
The armoured infantry brigades were reduced from three to two, as one was converted to a Strike Brigade. In a Defence Committee hearing, Chief of the General Staff Sir Nicholas Carter stated that "each of these [Strike] brigades will have two AJAX regiments and probably two Mechanised Infantry Vehicle (MIV) battalions as well". There was to be around 50 to 60 Ajax vehicles per Strike Brigade.

A December 2016 written statement stated that the first Strike Brigade to form would consist of:
Household Cavalry Regiment
King's Royal Hussars
1st Battalion, Scots Guards 
The Highlanders, 4th Battalion, Royal Regiment of Scotland

Other units such as 1 Regiment RLC, 1 Close Support Battalion REME, 3 Medical Regiment and 21 Engineer Regiment would  provide close support to this Strike Brigade. 3rd Regiment, Royal Horse Artillery, and 4th Regiment, Royal Artillery were to provide artillery support to the Strike Brigades.

Specialised Infantry Group
A total of five Specialised Infantry battalions, around 300 personnel strong:
Royal Scots Borderers, 1st Battalion, Royal Regiment of Scotland
4th Battalion, The Rifles
2nd Battalion, Princess of Wales’s Royal Regiment
2nd Battalion, Duke of Lancaster's Regiment
3rd Battalion, Royal Gurkha Rifles (formed in 2018)

Other changes
Several units were initially meant to be rationalised, with all manpower in those units being redeployed to other areas of the Army in its refined structure. These were originally:
Headquarters, 102nd Logistic Brigade
35 Engineer Regiment
Headquarters, 64 Works Group, Royal Engineers
2 Medical Regiment
Headquarters, 4th Regiment, Royal Military Police
33 Field Hospital
104, 105 and 106 Battalions of the Royal Electrical and Mechanical Engineers
32nd Regiment, Royal Artillery

However, 35 Engineer Regiment was retained and reformed as an explosive ordnance and search regiment. 32nd Regiment, Royal Artillery, was also retained in October 2019.

The Scottish and Prince of Wales' Divisions of infantry merged, incorporating the Royal Regiment of Scotland, Royal Welsh and Royal Irish Regiment. This administrative division was called the Scottish, Welsh and Irish Division. The Mercian Regiment transferred from the Prince of Wales’ Division to the King's Division.

Field Army restructuring 2019
The Field Army was restructured in July/August 2019 as set out below.
1st (United Kingdom) Division
4th Infantry Brigade and Headquarters North East
7th Infantry Brigade and Headquarters East
11th Infantry Brigade and Headquarters South East
51st Infantry Brigade and Headquarters Scotland
8th Engineer Brigade
102nd Logistic Brigade
104th Logistic Support Brigade
2nd Medical Brigade
3rd (United Kingdom) Division
1st Armoured Infantry Brigade
12th Armoured Infantry Brigade
20th Armoured Infantry Brigade
1st Artillery Brigade
101 Logistic Brigade
25 (Close Support) Engineer Group
7th Air Defence Group
6th (United Kingdom) Division (formerly Force Troops Command)
1st Signal Brigade (United Kingdom)
 11th Signal Brigade
1st Intelligence, Surveillance and Reconnaissance Brigade
Specialised Infantry Group
77th Brigade

See also
 Future of the Royal Navy
 Future of the Royal Air Force
 List of equipment of the British Army
 List of units and formations of the British Army 2020

References

External links
 Army 2020 Brochure
 Army 2020 July 2013 update
 Regular British Army basing plan March 2013
 Major British Army sites
 Structure of regular British Army as given by AFF
 Army Reserve changes and future basing
 Partial information via FOIA on Army 2020 Refine Units
 Army Information Sub-Strategy (2015 – 2018)
 Future of the Army - British Army website

21st-century military history of the United Kingdom